Mal Blum is an American songwriter, musician, writer and performer from New York. Blum has released six full-length albums, most recently Pity Boy in 2019.

Career 
Blum spent their early career promoting self-booked DIY solo tours and also self-released their early albums before signing to record labels.

In 2014, they signed to punk label Don Giovanni records and announced they would be working on a new album produced by Marissa Paternoster of the band Screaming Females. After the Don Giovanni release of You Look a Lot Like Me in 2015, Blum began touring nationally with a band, contributing to what critics called a "more developed but still gritty, punk" sound.

Blum was a recurring musical and comedic guest on The Chris Gethard Show They have also appeared as a musical guest on the Welcome to Night Vale (WTNV) podcast and have toured extensively opening for WTNV's National and International live shows in 2018, 2019 and 2023 

In February 2019 Blum released a new single, "Things Still Left To Say," and in March 2019 they toured with Lucy Dacus. That year they released the album Pity Boy,  recorded with Joe Reinhart of Hop Along at Headroom Studios in Philadelphia. Pitchfork's Abby Jones categorized Pity Boy as a shift "into potent pop-punk that recalls both Hop Along and Titus Andronicus." noting the newfound focus on guitarist Audrey Zee Whitesides' electric riffs, while maintaining the lyrics as "the album's centerpiece" writes Jones, If the electric guitar had evolved into a supporting actor by Blum’s last album, 2016’s You Look a Lot Like Me, then it’s the lead on Pity Boy. The nimble, vigorous riffs [...] ricocheting like rubber balls around “I Don’t Want To” and “Not My Job” with Blum’s vocals surging in countermelody.

Max Cohen, in their review for Bandcamp's "Album of the Day" series, writes of Pity Boy's production value:
 It’s punk in spirit, but the production is rich and warm, wrapping the power chords and solos in a sunny, welcoming fuzz. At their best, as on the jangly opener “Things Still Left to Say,” they sound like The Buzzcocks, if The Buzzcocks opted for compassion instead of bile.

On Oct 20, 2020 Blum announced a new single to be released on Saddle Creek Records as part of the label's 7 inch series.

In August 2020, Mal Blum was tapped to write music for Season 2 of Netflix's Trinkets television show. They wrote the song "Passenger Seat" to be used in a recurring story arc for the character Elodie.

Blum signed a publishing deal with Terrorbird Media seemingly during this same time period  and began contributing music to other tv and film projects. Upon co-writing with other artists on the roster, he forged a connection with Kyle Andrews and together the two worked remotely during the pandemic on a collection of 6 songs that would ultimately become the EP "Ain't it Nice."

On April 15, 2022 Mal Blum released "Ain't it Nice" which critics described musically as "a bridge between indie rock and Americana" 
Thematically, writer Mel Woods described the EP as <blockquote> a dust-covered collection of tracks that wouldn’t sound out of place in a wayward diner off the side of the highway. Drawing inspiration from John Prine, Bruce Springsteen and others, Blum has crafted a record steeped in pandemic loneliness and the messiness of queer and trans masculinity.
</blockquote>

On February 11, 2023 Blum announced plans to record a new full length album with producer Jessica Boudreaux of the band Summer Cannibals 

 Personal life 
Blum is openly transgender and queer, they have spoken only briefly about their voice changing while recording "Ain't it Nice" in 2020 

They attended State University of New York at Purchase. They are Jewish. Of their songwriting style, a recent reviewer writes: Although their songs’ subject matters often touch on heavier subjects, Blum’s dry approach to otherwise difficult topics typifies Jewish humor.

Blum was diagnosed with ADHD at a young age, but has only spoken occasionally about it in interviews.

DiscographyAin't It Nice (2022)
Stockpiled Guns & TV Dinners
Candy Bars & Men
Everybody Loves You (ft Laura Stevenson)
Anybody Else
Hollywood
The RoadNobody Waits (2020)
Nobody Waits 
San Cristóbal

 Pity Boy (2019)
Things Still Left To Say
Not My Job
See Me
Odds
Splinter
Black Coffee
Did You Get What You Wanted
I Don't Want To
Salt Flats
Well, Fuck
Gotta Go
Maybe I'll WaitYou Look A Lot Like Me (2015)
Archive
Better Go
Robert Frost
Cool Party
Split, Splitting
Reality TV
Iowa
Better Than I Was
New Orleans
The Shrink ThinksTempest In A Teacup (2013)
Overseas Now						
Side I'm On						
Altitude (This Party Sucks)						
The Bodies, The Zombies!						
Counting My Breaths						
Brooklyn						
With Samson In Washington State						
The Difference						
Valentine's DayEvery Time You Go Somewhere (2010)
San Cristóbal						
Watercolors
Baltimore						
New Year's Eve						
Fine!						
Wait Forever, Baby						
Circus Heart Pt. 1						
Circus Heart Pt. 2						
I Got Drunk					
WearyGoodnight Sugarpop'' (2008)
Cut it off						
Dysmorphic						
Country Song						
Hypocrite						
My Name is Earthworm						
Waiting In Line						
The Suburban Summer Polka						
Tumbleweed						
Ode to Kulele * video reached number 10 on LOGO's Video of Year for 2009					
You Should Be Here						
The Jugular						
I have been listening

See also
 LGBT culture in New York City
 List of LGBT people from New York City

Notes

References

External links 

 Official website

Songwriters from New York (state)
Living people
American LGBT musicians
LGBT Jews
Transgender singers
Musicians from New York (state)
State University of New York at Purchase alumni
Non-binary musicians
Year of birth missing (living people)
Don Giovanni Records artists